Sarab County is in East Azerbaijan province, Iran. The capital of the county is the city of Sarab. At the 2006 census, the county's population was 132,094 in 31,977 households. The following census in 2011 counted 131,934 people in 37,029 households. At the 2016 census, the county's population was 125,341 in 38,446 households.

Administrative divisions

The population history of Sarab County's administrative divisions over three consecutive censuses is shown in the following table. The latest census shows two districts, nine rural districts, and four cities.

References

 

Counties of East Azerbaijan Province